Fasach  is a crofting settlement in Glendale on the Duirinish peninsula of the Isle of Skye, Scottish Highlands and is in the Scottish council area of Highland.

References

Populated places in the Isle of Skye